Camellia lucii is a species of flowering tree in the tea family. Originally native to Vietnam, the species is not known to exist in the wild.

Discovery
Camellia lucii was first noticed by scientists in 1999 at a commercial nursery in Hanoi. It was stated that the specimen was collected in the mountains near the city. In 2001, cuttings were taken from the specimen and grafted onto Camellia amplexicaulis rootstocks in Kulnura, Australia. Additional plants were propagated, and in 2015 the species was formally described. The species epithet is named for André Luc, an expert in Camellia.

Description
C. lucii is a small, flowering tree that strongly resembles C. amplexicaulis, but has white flowers. It can also be distinguished from C. amplexicaulis by the shape of the flowers, styles, and fruit, as well as by the surface of mature leaves.

References

lucii
Plants extinct in the wild
Plants described in 2015